Michael O'Herlihy (1 April 1929 – 16 June 1997) was an Irish television producer and director who directed shows like Gunsmoke (1955), Maverick (1957), Star Trek (1965), Hawaii Five-O (1968), M*A*S*H (1972) and The A-Team (1983).

Born in Dublin, Ireland, O'Herlihy was the younger brother of actor Dan O'Herlihy. He died in Dublin, on 16 June 1997 at age 69.

Filmography

Director
 The Fighting Prince of Donegal (1966)
 The One and Only, Genuine, Original Family Band (1968)
 Smith! (1969)

Television

 Bronco (1 episode, 1961)
 Surfside 6 (3 episodes, 1961)
 Maverick 3 episodes, 1961–1962)
 77 Sunset Strip (4 episodes, 1961–1962)
 The Lieutenant (1 episode, 1963)
 The Richard Boone Show (1 episode, 1964)
 Profiles in Courage (1 episode, 1964)
 The Man from U.N.C.L.E. (1 episode, 1964)
 Kraft Suspense Theatre (1 episode, 1964)
 Mr. Novak (11 episodes, 1963–1965)
 Rawhide (5 episodes, 1964–1965)
 Star Trek (1 episode, 1967)
 The Guns of Will Sonnett (2 episodes, 1968)
 Mission: Impossible (3 episodes, 1967–1968)
 The Young Loner (1968)
 The Outcasts (1 episode, 1968)
 It Takes a Thief (1 episode, 1969)
 Judd, for the Defense (1 episode, 1969)
 Then Came Bronson (1 episode, 1969)
 The F.B.I. (1 episode, 1970)
 The Interns (1 episode, 1970)
 The Wonderful World of Disney (6 episodes, 1967–1972)
 Cade's County (1 episode, 1972)
 Anna and the King (1 episode, 1972)
 M*A*S*H (1 episode, 1972)
 Deadly Harvest (1972)
 Cannon (2 episodes, 1972)
 Mannix (3 episodes, 1968–1973)
 The Streets of San Francisco (1 episode, 1973)
 The New Adventures of Perry Mason (2 episodes, 1973–1974)
 Evel Knievel (1974)
 Gunsmoke (4 episodes, 1964–1974)
 Young Pioneers (1976)
 Young Pioneers' Christmas (1976)
 Kiss Me, Kill Me (1976)
 Hawaii Five-O (24 episodes, 1969–1976)
 Police Story (6 episodes, 1975–1977)
 Man from Atlantis (1 episode, 1977)
 Peter Lundy and the Medicine Hat Stallion (1977)
 Logan's Run (1 episode, 1978)
 Backstairs at the White House (1979)
 The Flame Is Love (1979)
 Dallas Cowboys Cheerleaders II (1980)
 Detour to Terror (1980)
 The Great Cash Giveaway Getaway (1980)
 Cry of the Innocent (1980)
 Desperate Voyage (1980)
 A Time for Miracles (1980)
 Nero Wolfe (1 episode, 1981)
 The Million Dollar Face (1981)
 McClain's Law (1 episode, 1981)
 Bret Maverick (1 episode, 1982)
 Seven Brides for Seven Brothers (Unknown episodes, 1982–1983)
 Magnum, P.I. (1 episode, 1983)
 I Married Wyatt Earp (1983)
 The Fall Guy (9 episodes, 1982-1984)
 Riptide (Unknown episodes)
 Trapper John, M.D. (1 episode, 1984)
 Two by Forsyth (1984)
 Crazy Like a Fox (Unknown episodes)
 The Equalizer (Unknown episodes)
 Miami Vice (1 episode, 1985)
 The A-Team (20 episodes, 1984–1986)
 Matlock (1 episode, 1987)
 Hoover vs. the Kennedys: The Second Civil War (1987)
 Hunter (2 episodes, 1985–1988)

Producer
 Backstairs at the White House (1979)
 The Flame Is Love (1979)
 Cry of the Innocent (1980)

Award nominations

External links
 

1929 births
1997 deaths
Irish film directors
Irish television producers
Irish television directors
Mass media people from Dublin (city)